Tilly Rolston (February 23, 1887 – October 12, 1953) was a Canadian politician.

Initially elected to the British Columbia provincial legislature as a Conservative, she crossed the floor and joined W.A.C. Bennett in the British Columbia Social Credit Party before the watershed election in 1952.

She was the second woman to be a cabinet minister in British Columbia, and the first woman in Canada to have a portfolio. In her role as Minister of Education, she introduced a new method of school finance that came to be known as the "Rolston Formula". She was also instrumental in introducing what was effectively a sex-education program into the school curriculum.

She was defeated in the 1953 election by Liberal leader Arthur Laing. Despite her defeat she remained Education Minister until her death from cancer four months later.

Sources

British Columbia Social Credit Party MLAs
Women MLAs in British Columbia
1887 births
1953 deaths
20th-century Canadian women politicians
Women government ministers of Canada
Members of the Executive Council of British Columbia